The CMV Group is an Australian company which operates automotive dealerships and horticulture in South Australia and Victoria, employs more than 1,200 staff with an annual turnover in excess of $1 billion.

History
In 1934, CMV's founder Sidney Crawford  opened a dealership specialising in the sale and service of commercial transport vehicles, in particular British Leyland Trucks and the Diamond T brand.  The company began distributing Case tractors in 1935 and Commer products in 1938.

In 1963, the company began selling Toyota commercial vehicles. Between 1968 and 1988, under Sidney's son Jim Crawford, the business expanded and diversified, developing three divisions, CMV Automotive, CMV Trucks and CMV Farms. These divisions grew, both through reinvestment of revenue and by the acquisition of new franchises.

In 2016 CMV managing director Paul Crawford was presented with the Australian Entrepreneur of the Year Industry Prize.

Divisions

Trucks
In 2015,  CMV operates 16 trucking and parts businesses throughout South Australia and Victoria. These include CMV Truck Sales Kenworth-DAF Adelaide, South Central Trucks in South Australia and CMV Truck and Bus with six locations throughout Victoria. Products include new and used, small, medium and heavy duty trucks, trailers and buses, and parts and service support.

Agricultural
The Agricultural Division of the group was developed in 1978. In 2015, it specialises in wine grapes, pistachios and almonds. CMV Farms has land in Robinvale and Lindsay Point in Victoria, as well as Loxton and Langhorne Creek  in South Australia.

Automotive
CMV entered the automotive market in 1963 through the sale of Toyota vehicles (around 3,800 that year). In 2010 CMI completed a four level Toyota dealership covering 500,000 square metres; this was one of 50 dealership projects planned by Toyota Australia that year, and was the newest of CMV's eight automotive businesses throughout South Australia.

The CMV Group have branched into Jeep, Chrysler, Dodge, Lexus and more recently, Mercedes-Benz

Coach
CMV owned the Briscoes coach operation in Adelaide. It was sold in the 1980s to Bus Australia.

Community involvement
In 1993, The CMV Group established The CMV Foundation, a charitable trust deriving funding from the income of CMV's business operations.  The employees of the CMV Group have established The CMV Staff Charitable Foundation, funded by voluntary contributions from staff, which are then matched dollar for dollar by the CMV Foundation and donated to registered charities.

References

External links
Official website

Auto dealerships of Australia
Companies based in Adelaide
Australian companies established in 1934